Gampsocoris is the type genus of the subfamily Gampsocorinae and tribe Gampsocorini. These  stilt bugs species are mostly recorded from Europe and Africa.

Species 
According to BioLib the following are included:
 Gampsocoris africanus (Stusak, 1966)
 Gampsocoris bihamatus (Distant, 1909)
 Gampsocoris culicinus Seidenstücker, 1948
 Gampsocoris decorus (Uhler, 1893)
 Gampsocoris enslini Seidenstücker, 1953
 Gampsocoris gatai Günther, 1997
 Gampsocoris gibberosus (Horváth, 1922)
 Gampsocoris gomeranus Wagner, 1965
 Gampsocoris lilianae Josifov, 1958
 Gampsocoris linnavuorii Henry, 2016
 Gampsocoris minutus Josifov, 1965
 Gampsocoris pacificus (China, 1930)
 Gampsocoris panorminus Seidenstücker, 1965
 Gampsocoris punctipes (Germar, 1822)
 Gampsocoris tuberculatus (Štusák, 1966)

References

External links
 G. punctipes at British Bugs
 
 

Pentatomomorpha genera
Hemiptera of Europe